Svøo is a village in Hemsedal municipality, Norway. It is located in the traditional region of Hallingdal. Svøo is located on the river Hemsil which flows into the Hallingdalselva. Svøo is about five miles from the center of Hemsedal. Its population is 241.

References

Villages in Buskerud